The 2017 season of the IFSC Climbing World Cup was the 19th season of the competition. Bouldering competitions were being held at seven stops of the IFSC Climbing World Cup. The bouldering season began on April 7 at the World Cup in Meiringen, and concluded on 19 August at the World Cup in Munich. At each stop a qualifying was held on the first day, and the semi-final and final rounds were conducted on the second day of the competition. The winners were awarded trophies, and the best three finishers received medals. 
At the end of the season an overall ranking was determined based upon points, which athletes were awarded for finishing in the top 30 of each individual event. Shauna Coxsey won the women's World Cup and Jongwon Chon won the men's World Cup.

Changes from the previous season 

For the 2017 season the IFSC changed the timing method for the finals of World Cup tournaments. Beginning in 2017 any attempt would only be considered successful if the athlete had reached the top and demonstrated control over it within the four minute time limit. (four minutes dead rule) Previously boulderers had four minutes per boulder, but a boulderer was allowed to finish their attempt if they had successfully started the boulder within the four minute limit. (four minutes plus rule)

Streaming controversy 

Before the start of the 2017 season the IFSC announced that they had signed a three-year contract with the streaming platform FloSports, which would have made the streams of climbing World Cups available only to paying customers instead of being freely accessible. This led to an online petition asking the IFSC to change their deal with FloSports, which was signed by more than 12,000 people, and an open letter by the Athletes' Commission. The Commission voiced their frustration over the way the IFSC had previously communicated with the community at large, and "asked the athletes to withdraw cooperation with the livestream media until changes are made". On the next day the IFSC apologized for having made a mistake, and announced that the deal with FloSports had not actually been signed yet despite the earlier press release, and would not be concluded.

Overall ranking

Men

Women

National teams 

Country names as used by the IFSC

Meiringen, Switzerland (7–8 April)

Women 
78 athletes attended the World Cup in Meiringen. Shauna Coxsey (4t10 4b8) won the competition in front of Katharina Saurwein (2t6 3b13).

Men 
115 athletes attended the World Cup in Meiringen. Kokoro Fujii (1t1 3b6) won the competition in front of Alexey Rubtsov (1t2 2b8).

Chongqing, China (22–23 April)

Women 
42 athletes attended the World Cup in Chongqing. Janja Garnbret (4t11 4b7) won the competition in front of Shauna Coxsey (3t4 4b5).

Men 
77 athletes attended the World Cup in Chongqing. Jongwon Chon (4t6 4b5) won the competition in front of Tomoa Narasaki (2t2 3b3), who claimed the second place over Alexey Rubtsov by virtue of his better semi-final score.

Nanjing, China (29–30 April)

Women 
50 athletes attended the World Cup in Nanjing. Shauna Coxsey (4t12 4b12) won her second World Cup competition of the season. At this point Coxsey and Nanjing runner-up Janja Garnbret (3t7 3b7) were the only two athletes to have made the final of all World Cups of the season.

Men 
83 athletes attended the World Cup in Nanjing. Keita Watabe (4t9 4b8), the only athlete in all World Cup finals of the season at this point, won his first World Cup competition. Tomoa Narasaki (3t6 4b7) came in second.

Hachioji, Japan (6–7 May)

Women 
54 athletes attended the World Cup in Hachiōji, Tokyo. Janja Garnbret (4t5 4b4) won her second World Cup of the season. Akiyo Noguchi (4t9 4b9) won the silver medal.

Men 
84 athletes attended the World Cup in Hachiōji. Alexey Rubtsov (3t8 4b13) won the World Cup in front of Tomoa Narasaki (3t9 4b19), who had his third consecutive silver medal finish.

Vail, United States (9–10 June)

Women 
55 athletes attended the World Cup in Vail. Shauna Coxsey (4t5 4b4) won her third World Cup of the season. Akiyo Noguchi (4t9 4b9) won silver again. For the first time this season Janja Garnbret did not reach the final.

Men 
59 athletes attended the World Cup in Vail. Jongwon Chon (4t9 4b8) won the World Cup in front of Meichi Narasaki (3t6 3b5).

Navi Mumbai, India (24–25 June)

Women 
41 athletes attended the World Cup in Navi Mumbai. Shauna Coxsey (4t11 4b8) won her fourth World Cup of the season, thereby securing the overall seasonal title. Miho Nonaka (3t7 4b11) came in second.

Men 
58 athletes attended the World Cup in Navi Mumbai. Jongwon Chon (4t10 4b10) won the World Cup in front of Rei Sugimoto (3t6 3b4). This left Chon, Rubtsov, and Watabe with a chance to claim the overall title at the final World Cup of the season in Munich.

Munich, Germany (18–19 August)

Women 
114 athletes attended the World Cup in Munich. Janja Garnbret (3t10 3b6) won her second World Cup of the season, thereby securing the second place overall. Shauna Coxsey (2t2 2b2) won the Silver medal. She had locked up the overall title before the Munich competition already.

Men 
166 athletes attended the World Cup in Munich. Germany's Jan Hojer (4t10 4b6) won the World Cup in front of Tomoa Narasaki (3t6 3b3). However, Narasaki's four second places over the course of the season were not enough to defend his overall title. The overall title went to Jongwon Chon, who had come in fourth in Munich.

References 

IFSC Climbing World Cup
2017 in sport climbing